This is a list of the National Register of Historic Places listings in Potter County, Texas

This is intended to be a complete list of properties and districts listed on the National Register of Historic Places in Potter County, Texas. Five districts including one national monument and 29 individual properties are listed on the National Register in the county. Thirteen of the county's Recorded Texas Historic Landmarks are included in the National Register.

Current listings

The publicly disclosed locations of National Register properties and districts may be seen in a mapping service provided.

|}

See also

National Register of Historic Places listings in Texas
Recorded Texas Historic Landmarks in Potter County

References

External links

Registered Historic Places
Potter County